Jared Mayden (born June 24, 1998) is an American football safety for the Buffalo Bills of the National Football League (NFL). He played college football at Alabama.

College career
Mayden started at safety as a senior at Alabama. He totalled four interceptions and allowed 17 receptions on 30 targets for 152 yards during the season. Mayden also racked up 59 tackles, three tackles for a loss and three pass breakups, and was praised for his versatility in playing several defensive positions. Mayden participated in the Senior Bowl.

Professional career

San Francisco 49ers
Mayden was signed by the San Francisco 49ers as an undrafted free agent on April 28, 2020. He was waived on September 5, 2020, and signed to the practice squad the next day. He was elevated to the active roster on October 24 and November 14 for the team's weeks 7 and 10 games against the New England Patriots and New Orleans Saints, and reverted to the practice squad after each game. He was placed on the practice squad/injured list on November 17, 2020. He signed a reserve/future contract on January 6, 2021.

On August 31, 2021, Mayden was waived by the 49ers and re-signed to the practice squad the next day. He was released on October 18.

Philadelphia Eagles
On October 26, 2021, Mayden was signed to the Philadelphia Eagles practice squad. He signed a reserve/future contract with the Eagles on January 18, 2022. He was waived/injured on August 16 and placed on injured reserve. He was released on September 20.

Buffalo Bills
On October 10, 2022, Mayden was signed to the Buffalo Bills practice squad. On November 3, he was cut from the practice squad.

New York Jets
On November 5, 2022, Mayden was signed to the New York Jets practice squad.

Buffalo Bills (second stint)
On January 4, 2023, Mayden was signed by the Buffalo Bills off the Jets practice squad.

References

External links
San Francisco 49ers bio
Alabama Crimson Tide football bio

1998 births
Living people
American football safeties
Alabama Crimson Tide football players
Buffalo Bills players
New York Jets players
People from Collin County, Texas
People from Dallas County, Texas
Philadelphia Eagles players
Players of American football from Texas
San Francisco 49ers players
Sportspeople from the Dallas–Fort Worth metroplex